Anette Wilhelm (born Anette Svensson on 22 March 1972) is a Swedish wheelchair curler. She was on the bronze winning Swedish team at Wheelchair curling at the 2006 Winter Paralympics. She was also on the silver medal-winning Swedish team at the 2009 world championship. She has two children and was paralyzed in an accident.

Results

Private life
She is married to fellow curling coach Thomas Wilhelm.

References

External links

Profile at the Official Website for the 2010 Winter Paralympics in Vancouver

1972 births
Living people
Medalists at the 2006 Winter Paralympics
Medalists at the 2010 Winter Paralympics
Paralympic bronze medalists for Sweden
Paralympic wheelchair curlers of Sweden
Swedish female curlers
Swedish wheelchair curlers
Wheelchair curlers at the 2006 Winter Paralympics
Wheelchair curlers at the 2010 Winter Paralympics
Paralympic medalists in wheelchair curling
21st-century Swedish women